The Battle of Kizil-tepe (Turkish: Kızıltepe Muharebresi) was fought on August 25, 1877, between the Russian Empire and the Ottoman Empire. The Russian were attempting to besiege Kars. The Ottomans, vastly superior in numbers, successfully lifted the siege.

Notes

References 

 Barry, Quentin (2012). War in the East: a Military History of the Russo-Turkish War 1877-78. West Midlands: Helion and Company. .
Harbottle, T.B. (2018). Dictionary of Battles From the Earliest Date to the Present Time. Franklin Classics. ISBN  9780341839699.
Jaques, T. (2006). Dictionary of battles and sieges [3 volumes]: A guide to 8,500 battles from antiquity through the twenty-first century. Westport, CT: Greenwood Press. ISBN  9780313335365.

Battles of the Russo-Turkish War (1877–1878)
Sieges involving Russia
Sieges involving the Ottoman Empire
Battles involving the Ottoman Empire
1877 in the Ottoman Empire
History of Kars Province
Conflicts in 1877
August 1877 events